David Vickery is a British visual effects supervisor.

On 24 January 2012, he was nominated for an Oscar for the film Harry Potter and the Deathly Hallows – Part 2.

References

External links

Living people
Best Visual Effects BAFTA Award winners
Visual effects supervisors
Year of birth missing (living people)
Place of birth missing (living people)